Vijeesh Mani is a producer and director of Malayalam language films. He is best known as the director of Vishwaguru, a film that was made and released in 51 hours and 2 minutes following a "script to screen" rule, which was recorded in Guinness World Records.

The environmental film Puzhayamma starring Baby Meenakshi and Linda Arsenio in lead roles and the Irula language film Netaji with Gokulam Gopalan as lead actor that won Guinness award for the first tribal language film are getting ready for theatrical release.

Mani's Sanskrit film Namo starring Jayaram has been completed..His Mmmmm starring I.M.Vijayan, produced by Sohan Roy won several accolades. Producer Sohan Roy has teamed with Mani again for Aadhivaasi, the film based on the death of a youth named Madhu at Attappadi.

Filmography

References

External links 

Living people
Film producers from Kerala
Malayalam film directors
Film directors from Kerala
Malayalam film producers
Tamil film producers
People from Guruvayur
20th-century Indian film directors
21st-century Indian film directors
1977 births
Organic farmers